Jeleńcz  is a village in Gmina Parchowo, Bytów County, Pomeranian Voivodeship, in northern Poland.

From 1975 to 1998 the village was in Słupsk Voivodeship.

It has a population of 111.

References

Map of the Gmina Parchowo

Villages in Bytów County